Longitarsus violentoides is a species of beetle in the subfamily Galerucinae that is endemic to Armenia.

References

V
Beetles described in 2000
Endemic fauna of Armenia
Beetles of Europe